Michał Cieśla, (born August 4, 1981), is a Polish professional basketball player.  He was born in Częstochowa, Poland, and is currently playing at shooting guard for the Bradford Dragons in the English Basketball League (EB1).  He can also play as a point guard.

Career
 1998-2005: Tytan Częstochowa 
 2005-2007: AZS WSZ Częstochowa 
 2007-2009: Start Dobrodzień 
 2009-2010: Mansfield Giants 
 2010-2012: Bradford Dragons

References

1981 births
Living people
Polish men's basketball players
Shooting guards
Point guards
Sportspeople from Częstochowa